A lock-out device is a system used on game shows, particularly trivia shows, to determine in real time which contestant has activated their signal first. The system is designed to detect the first signal it receives and ignore subsequent signals. The system provides some indication of which contestant has signaled, such as a light or sound for each contestant, allowing the relevant parties to clearly determine who has signaled first.

Perhaps the most famous modern game show to use a lock-out device is Jeopardy!, which uses a sophisticated system that is so fundamental to the game, mastering the signaling device is commonly said to be at least as important as knowing the correct response to each clue. Once the host has finished reading a clue, a backstage crew member manually activates the system; a contestant who presses their signal button too early becomes locked out for a fraction of a second.

Lock-out systems are also commonly used in quiz bowl competitions. The lock-out device is typically controlled by the game's moderator or judges. Lock-out devices used in quiz bowl competitions often also include a timer, with a buzzer that sounds when the time allotted for answering a given question has expired.

References

Game shows